The Carry On EP is the debut extended play released by People on Vacation, a supergroup composed of Ryan Hamilton from indie rock band Smile Smile and Jaret Reddick from pop punk band Bowling for Soup. The EP was released on November 24, 2011, in the United States both on CD and as a digital download. The EP was released in the United Kingdom for download on February 13, 2012, and was released on CD as a split with Bowling for Soup bassist Erik Chandler's solo project on March 26, 2012. The group released their full-length album, The Summer and the Fall, on November 22, 2012, featuring the same recordings of "Rainy Day," "It's Not Love," and "Where Do We Go" from The Carry on EP.

Track listing

B-sides
 "ADV Club"1:33
 "It Must Be Christmas" (Released on The Light Connected: A Holiday Music Collection, a Kirtland Records holiday compilation)4:59

People on Vacation

 Jaret Reddickvocals, guitar, producer 
 Ryan Hamiltonvocals, guitar, keyboards, producer
 Additional musicians:
 Linus of Hollywoodguitar, keyboards, producer
 Tom Polce (of Letters to Cleo)drums
 Erik Chandler (of Bowling for Soup)bass
 Recorded at The Daycare in Highland Village, Texas
 Additional recording at The Tackle Box in Hollywood and The Lair in Los Angeles, California
 Mixed by Tom Polce
 Mastered by Dave Collins
 Package Design by Brad Bond
 Photos by Will Bolton
 Photo of Ryan and Jaret by Melissa Reddick
 Management: Rainmaker Artists

References

People on Vacation albums
2011 debut EPs